Dundas is a city in Rice County, Minnesota, United States. The population was 1,367 at the 2010 census. Dundas is bordered by the city of Northfield. United States Army Major General Ulysses G. McAlexander was born in Dundas in 1864.

History

Dundas was platted in 1857 by the Archibalds: brothers John Sidney and Edward T., along with their cousin George Archibald, who built mills on both sides of the Cannon River. The brothers named the city after their home Dundas County, Ontario, Canada.  

The ruins of The Archibald Mill a flour mill can still be seen today on the west bank of the Cannon River.  The milling industry contributed greatly to Dundas' 19th-century success, and at one point the mills in Dundas were considered among the best in the world.

The city's original central business district was located on Second Street, and by 1866 it included two general stores, a library, hotel, shoe store, restaurant, meeting hall and saloon.  The neighborhood began to shift once the Minnesota Central Railway built its station on the west side of the river, resulting in the development of Railway Street and the platting of the Railway Addition in 1865.  All that remains of the original commercial district is the Ault Store (built in 1866), which started as a general store and housed the town's first library on the second floor; the same building also served as the home of the Dundas News for its operation from 1876-79 when it was bought and absorbed by the Northfield News.

The Archibald Mill, Adult Store and Edward T. Archibald House are among the five local structures listed on the National Register of Historic Places.

Today, the town is chiefly a bedroom community for nearby Northfield and the more distant Minneapolis-St. Paul metropolitan area. The juxtaposition of Dundas and Northfield and their disparate zoning policies and attitudes toward development have led to some unusual growth patterns. Dundas is home to a number of businesses, such as an off-sale liquor store and two bars that would be unable to get licenses to operate in Northfield. Contrary to popular opinion and local lore, Dundas Technical University (Dundas Tech) only exists on T-shirts and jokes from Northfield and Faribault natives.

Dundas has the only public feed mill within about 40 miles. It is operated by Interstate Mills on the site of the original grain elevator. In 1999, the threat of a Target store being sited in Dundas—rather than Northfield—was instrumental in forcing changes to Northfield's zoning to allow such uses.

A Union Pacific freight railroad line passes through Dundas.

Geography
The Cannon River passes through the center of town. The latitude of Dundas is 44.429N. The longitude is 93.204W. Dundas' elevation is 932 feet above sea level.

Minnesota State Highway 3 and Rice County Road 1 are two of the main routes in the community. Interstate 35 is nearby.

Demographics

2010 census
As of the census of 2010, there were 1,367 people, 514 households, and 376 families residing in the city. The racial makeup of the city was 93.9% White, 0.7% African American, 0.3% Native American, 1.6% Asian, 2.2% from other races, and 1.3% from two or more races. Hispanic or Latino of any race were 4.6% of the population.

There were 514 households, of which 38.9% had children under the age of 18 living with them, 62.1% were married couples living together, 6.6% had a female householder with no husband present, 4.5% had a male householder with no wife present, and 26.8% were non-families. 20.0% of all households were made up of individuals, and 5.5% had someone living alone who was 65 years of age or older. The average household size was 2.66 and the average family size was 3.08.

The median age in the city was 33.6 years. 27.7% of residents were under the age of 18; 6.2% were between the ages of 18 and 24; 34.5% were from 25 to 44; 23.4% were from 45 to 64; and 8.3% were 65 years of age or older. The gender makeup of the city was 50.6% male and 49.4% female.

2000 census
As of the census of 2000, there were 547 people, 213 households, and 146 families residing in the city. The racial makeup of the city was 97.26% White, 1.28% African American, 1.10% from other races, and 0.37% from two or more races. Hispanic or Latino of any race were 2.38% of the population.

There were 213 households, out of which 33.8% had children under the age of 18 living with them, 56.3% were married couples living together, 10.8% had a female householder with no husband present, and 31.0% were non-families. 24.9% of all households were made up of individuals, and 8.5% had someone living alone who was 65 years of age or older. The average household size was 2.57 and the average family size was 3.09.

In the city, the population was spread out, with 25.8% under the age of 18, 12.4% from 18 to 24, 33.6% from 25 to 44, 19.2% from 45 to 64, and 9.0% who were 65 years of age or older. The median age was 33 years. For every 100 females, there were 104.9 males. For every 100 females age 18 and over, there were 102.0 males.

The median income for a household in the city was $51,429, and the median income for a family was $55,250. Males had a median income of $32,167 versus $29,306 for females. The per capita income for the city was $20,316. About 4.8% of families and 7.8% of the population were below the poverty line, including 14.8% of those under age 18 and 4.2% of those age 65 or over.

References

Cities in Minnesota
Cities in Rice County, Minnesota